Birago Diop (11 December 1906 – 25 November 1989) was a Senegalese poet and storyteller whose work restored general interest in African folktales and promoted him to one of the most outstanding African francophone writers. A renowned veterinarian, diplomat and leading voice of the Négritude literary movement, Diop exemplified the "African renaissance man".

Early life 
Son of Ismael and Sokhna Diop, Birago Diop was born on 11 December 1906 in Ouakam, a neighborhood in Dakar, Senegal. His mother raised him with his two older brothers, Massyla and Youssoupha; his father, for unknown reasons, disappeared two months before Diop was born. Diop's childhood exposed him to many folktales, which he later used in his literary work.

In 1920, Diop earned a scholarship to attend the French-speaking school Lycée Faidherbe in Saint-Louis, which was then Senegal's capital. During this time, he became fascinated with the poems and style of writing of Victor Hugo, Charles Baudelaire, Edgar Allan Poe and several others and began writing his own. In the late 1920s, he served as a nurse in a military hospital and later went on to study veterinary medicine at the University of Toulouse in France, graduating in 1933.

Career 
Although he was mostly recognized for his poems and folktales, Diop also worked as a veterinary surgeon for the French colonial government in several West African countries, spending 1937–39 in the French Sudan (now Mali), 1940 in the Ivory Coast and French Upper Volta (now Burkina Faso), and 1950 in Mauritania. Throughout his civil service career in 1934, he collected and reworked Wolof folktales, and also wrote poetry, memoirs, and a play.  He also served as the first Senegalese ambassador to Tunisia from 1960 to 1965.

Early literary work 

During his time in France as a veterinary student, Diop met numerous African, African-American and Caribbean students, among them Léopold Sédar Senghor, who later went on to become Senegal's first president after its independence. Inspired by these young black intellectuals, artists and poets, Diop drafted his earliest poems in L'étudiant noir ("the black student") - a student review that established the idea of the Négritude movement, which protested against the assimilation theory in favour of African cultural values.

Inspiration 

During his work as the head of the government's cattle-inspection service for several regions in Senegal and Mali, he was introduced to traditional folktales, most of which he committed to memory. These served as the main inspiration for much of his literary work. Indeed, most of his poems and tales have their roots in oral African traditions. Generally recited to a group at night by a professional storyteller, called a griot, folktales were repeated in different places by the people who heard them. These ceremonies commonly consisted of songs and dances in addition to these folktales. Although the tales served as entertainment, they also had the greater purpose of teaching younger generations about the beliefs and values of their ancestors. By combining his mastery of the French language with his experience with African folktakes, Diop was able to spread the values and beliefs of his ancestors throughout the world.

During and after World War II 
In the early 1940s, during World War II, Diop was forced to return to France for two years. Homesick, he began writing down adaptions of folktales as advised by his fellow Negritude writers. The following excerpt illustrating his homesickness can be found in "The Humps":

"Here, far from my home in Senegal, my eyes are surrounded by closed horizons. When the greens of summer and the russets of autumn have passed, I seek the vast expanses of the Savannah, and find only bare mountains, sombre as ancient prostrate giants that the snow refuses to bury because of their misdeed...." (from "The Humps").

When Diop finally returned to Africa, he served as a director of zoological technical services in Ivory Coast and Upper Volta (modern day Burkina Faso). His first literary piece Les Contes d'Amadou Koumba was published in 1947. The work, totaling three volumes, managed to earn him the Grand prix littéraire award. Each volume contained a collection of short stories: animal-centred tales he directly transcribed from the griot Amadou Koumba's accounts. These tales provided a combination of humor, fantasy and realism where people, supernatural beings, and animals interacted.

"The broken pen" 
As soon as Senegal gained its independence, Diop was nominated as the first Senegalese ambassador in Tunisia. Upon accepting this position, he claimed to have "broken his pen," suggesting that he was ready to give up writing altogether and focus on his diplomatic career. It was not until the mid-1970s, towards the end of his life, that his "pen was mended." He published La plume raboutée in 1978, followed by À rebrousse-temps (1982), À rebrousse-gens (1982), and Senegal du temps de...(1986).

Death
Birago Diop died on 25 November 1989 in Dakar at the age of 83. He was survived by his wife of many years, Marie-Louise Pradére, and two children, Renée and Andrée. His legacy includes the titles of novelist, diplomat, a founder of the Negritude movement and veterinarian. Even now, decades after his death, his stories and poems remain, sharing African values and culture.

List of works

Narrative
Tales of Amadou Koumba (Les contes d'Amadou Koumba, 1947, tr. 1966)
New Tales of Amadou Koumba (Les nouveaux contes d'Amadou Koumba, 1958)
Tales and Commentaries (Contes et Lavanes, 1963)
Contes Choisis (1967)
Contes d'Awa (1977)
Poetry
Lures and Glimmers (Leurres et Lueurs, 1960)
Drama
L'os de Mor Lam (1977)
Memoirs
La Plume raboutée (1978)
A rebrousse-temps (1982)
A rebrousse-gens (1985)
Du temps de... (1986)
Et les yeux pour me dire (1989)

Awards

Grand Prix Littéraire de l'Afrique-Occidentale Francaise for Les Contes d'Amadou Koumba
Association des Ecrivains d'Expression Francaise de la Mer et de l'Outre Mer, Grand Prix Littéraire de l'Afrique Noire for Contes et lavanes
Officier de la Légion d'Honneur
Chevalier de l'Étoile Noire
Chevalier du Mérite Agricole

See also

Senegal
List of African writers

References

External links
 Birago Diop
 Archives de 'Birago Diop'

1906 births
1989 deaths
People of French West Africa
Senegalese poets
Storytellers
People from Dakar
Ambassadors of Senegal to Tunisia
Senegalese dramatists and playwrights
Senegalese veterinarians
Senegalese novelists